Point of No Return is an EP recorded by the thrash metal band, Havok. It was released May 22, 2012 through Candlelight Records. Music videos were made for the songs "Point of No Return" and "From the Cradle to the Grave". The track "Postmortem/Raining Blood" was featured as a bonus iTunes track for the 2011 album Time is Up.

Track listing 
Tracks 1 and 2 written by David Sanchez Havok

Personnel 
Havok
 David Sanchez – lead vocals, rhythm guitar
 Pete Webber – drums
 Reece Scruggs – lead guitar, backing vocals
 Jesse De Los Santos – bass

References 

2012 EPs
Havok (band) albums
Candlelight Records albums